The Hand of the Artist is a 1906 British short silent animated comedy film, directed by Walter R. Booth, featuring the director's hand bringing to life photographic images of a young man and woman only for each sequence to end in them being crumpled up. The film features early use of stop action to achieve its effect and had been described as the first British animated film. It survives as part of the Corrick Collection of the Corrick family entertainers who toured Australia and the world between 1901 and 1914.

References

External links

British black-and-white films
British silent short films
1906 comedy films
British comedy films
Films directed by Walter R. Booth
1900s stop-motion animated films
1906 short films
Silent comedy films